The Holmes Correctional Institution  is a state prison for men located in Bonifay, Holmes County, Florida, owned and operated by the Florida Department of Corrections.  With a mix of security levels including minimum, medium, and close, this facility was opened in 1988 and has a maximum capacity of 1185 prisoners.

Holmes correctional officer Col. Greg Malloy was killed in an exchange of gunfire in February 2011 as he assisted in the manhunt for local killer Wade Williams.

References

Prisons in Florida
Buildings and structures in Holmes County, Florida
1988 establishments in Florida